Dave and Domino are a eurobeat duo. They have appeared on the Super Eurobeat series including Super Euro X'mas and Eurobeat Disney 1–2. The names of the two singers are Giancarlo Pasquini and Alessandra Mirka Gatti (respectively).

Family, Hits, and Music Video
Giancarlo and Alessandra were married until 2004 when they divorced. They have one son, Federico Pasquini who sings under the name Kaioh. Dave and Domino had many hits including "I Believe In You", "Red Hot Zip", and "Sunshine In Your Eyes". "Sunshine In Your Eyes" is one of the few eurobeat songs to have a music video. The song's video was featured on Super Eurobeat Vol. 150 in a special DVD featuring interviews, music videos, and a history of parapara dancing.

Post-Dave and Domino
The last song to be released under the duo "Dave and Domino" was "Sunshine In Your Eyes" on Super Eurobeat Vol. 145 on February 18, 2004. Domino left A-Beat C sometime in early 2003 (songs released on Super Eurobeat albums are delayed by 1–2 years) and reappeared on Super Eurobeat Vol. 164 with her song "Fuku Wa Uchi" which she produced with SCP in 2004. She also has produced "Ashiteru" with SCP, which was done for the J-Euro coverband Hinoi Team. Domino has now recently founded a new Eurobeat label, Go Go's Music (named after one of her previous group aliases, Go Go Girls), and is currently writing various new songs for singers like Elena Gobbi, Mega NRG Man, new Eurobeat artists, and for herself and the "Go Go Girls" name.

Dave Rodgers continued to record duets with female artists, carrying on the "Dave and Domino" tradition with Nuage. Some of these songs include "Don't Make Me Cry," "Car Of Your Dreams," etc. He has also produced a number of songs with famed Power metal guitarist, Kiko Loureiro. In 2009, his tradition project still keep to hold with his new wife Evelyn Malferrari (Futura) in pre-SunFire's A-Beat C (until SunFire founded in 2010).

Discography

External
Dave & Domino at Discogs

Italian dance music groups
Eurobeat musicians